The Mystic is a 1925 American MGM silent drama film directed by Tod Browning, who later directed MGM's Freaks (1932). It was co-written by Browning and Waldemar Young, writing a similar storyline to their earlier 1925 hit film The Unholy Three. Browning was unable however to hire his favorite star Lon Chaney this time around, and The Mystic wound up a little-known film with a cast of now-forgotten names.
Aileen Pringle's gowns in the film were by already famous Romain de Tirtoff (known as Erté).
A print of the film exists.

Plot
As described in a film magazine reviews, Zara is a gypsy rogue who joins with Confederate Zazarack to aid Michael Nash, the crooked guardian of heiress Doris Merrick, to gain control of her estate by way of fake seances. Jimmie Barton with the aid of Zara and her gypsies succeeds in swindling the Wall Street financier out of his fortune. Jimmie tries to tell Zara that he loves her. In a fight with her confederates, he proves his love for her. Zara and her band are captured by the police, and Jimmie escapes with the loot. Zara’s suitor tries to get her to marry him, but seeing the hopelessness of his cause, he notifies Jimmie. They are reconciled after Jimmie returns the stolen money.

Cast

Footnotes

References
Eaker, Alfred. 2016. Tod Browning Retrospective. Retrieved 26 February 2021.

External links

Stills at silenthollywood.com

1925 films
Silent American drama films
American silent feature films
American black-and-white films
1925 drama films
Films directed by Tod Browning
Metro-Goldwyn-Mayer films
1920s American films